Borrowed Husbands is a 1924 American silent comedy film directed by David Smith and starring Florence Vidor. It was produced and distributed by Vitagraph Company of America.

Plot
As described in a film magazine review, Nancy Burrard's husband Gerard goes on a business trip to South America and she beguiles the lonely hours by borrowing a few husbands for flirtations purposes, and engaging in a flirtation with Major Desmond, who supposes her to be a widow. He meets her husband in South America, where the truth is made known to him. Many complications result through the philandering of Dr. Langwell with various married women and a nurse, who dies under suspicious circumstances. The martial troubles of the different wives are finally dispelled, and Nancy and her husband are reconciled so that all ends well.

Cast

Preservation
With no prints of Borrowed Husbands located in any film archives, it is a lost film.

References

External links

Lobby card at gettyimages.com

1924 films
Lost American films
Films directed by David Smith (director)
Vitagraph Studios films
American silent feature films
American black-and-white films
Silent American comedy films
1924 comedy films
1924 lost films
Lost comedy films
1920s American films